Ellisochloa is a genus of Namibian and South African plants in the grass family.

 Species
 Ellisochloa papposa (Nees) P.M.Peterson & N.P.Barker - Cape Province
 Ellisochloa rangei (Pilg.) P.M.Peterson & N.P.Barker - Namibia

See also
 List of Poaceae genera

References

Chloridoideae
Poaceae genera